Nam-Hai Chua FRS (born 8 April 1944) is a Singaporean botanist. He is an Andrew W. Mellon Emeritus Professor at Rockefeller University. He is now deputy chairman of Temasek Life Science Laboratory.

Life
He earned a BS from the National University of Singapore, and an AM and PhD from Harvard University in 1969. He taught at the University of Singapore Medical School, from 1969 to 1971. He was awarded the International Prize for Biology in 2005. He joined Rockefeller University in 1973 and remained there till his retirement from the university. Thereafter, he moved back to Singapore in 2016.

Awards and honors
 Royal Society of London (1988)
 Taiwan Academica Sinica (1988)
 Chinese Academy of Sciences (2006)
 Honorary Doctorate from NTU Singapore (2008)
 Singapore National Science and Technology Gold Medal (1998)
 Singapore Public Administration Gold Medal (2002) 
 International Prize in Biology (2005)
 NUS Distinguished Alumni Service Award 2017 
 Recognized as a Pioneer Member of the American Society of Plant Biologists.

References

External links
http://www.a-star.edu.sg/AwardsScholarships/PresidentsScienceandTechnologyAwards/PastNationalScienceTechnologyAwardsWinners/NSTAWinners1998/WinnerCitationProfChuaNamHai/tabid/628/Default.aspx

1944 births
Living people
Fellows of the Royal Society
Foreign members of the Chinese Academy of Sciences
Harvard University alumni
National University of Singapore alumni
Rockefeller University people
Singaporean expatriates in the United States
Singaporean people of Chinese descent
21st-century Singaporean biologists